The 4th constituency of Indre-et-Loire is one of five French legislative constituencies in the Indre-et-Loire département.

It consists of the following cantons;
Ballan-Miré, Chinon, Joué-lès-Tours, Sainte-Maure-de-Touraine.

Deputies

Election Results

2022

 
 
 
 
|-
| colspan="8" bgcolor="#E9E9E9"|
|-

2017

2012

References

4